Wipperfürth is a municipality in the Oberbergischer Kreis of North Rhine-Westphalia, Germany, about 40 km north-east of Cologne, and the oldest town in the Bergischen Land.

History
The eldest documentary mention dates from 1131. In the Siegburger Mirakelbuch the place is already designated Oppidum(=town). Manner of writing of the first naming: "Weperevorthe". Wipperfürth received town rights between 1217 and 1222. Since 1283 the administration of the town was governed by count Adolf V. von Berg. Already in 1275 king Rudolf von Habsburg allowed the count to move his mint from Wildberg to Wipperfürth. Here, Pfennige were stamped according to Cologne model. In 1328, with the privilege of king Louis the Bavarian the first coinage of Groschen in Germany began in Wipperfürth. Since the 14th century the town was a member of the Hanse. Businesspeople of the town traveled to Stockholm, Dorpat, Malmö, Novgorod, Reval and Lübeck. The town coat of arms of 1267 shows a church in merlons-reinforced wall. Leftovers of this town wall can still be found on the Klosterberg. The oldest building are located at the market, together with the market well. The development of the town was hindered by numerous town fires: 1333, 1352, 1368, 1383, 1404, 1412 and 1465. From 1815–1932 Wipperfürth was capital town of the district with the same name.

Geography

Geographical position
Wipperfürth lies on the flow Wupper which is designated in the upper reaches to the east of the town Wipper.

Neighbouring municipalities
The neighbouring municipalities and neighbouring towns are: Lindlar, Kürten, Wermelskirchen, Hückeswagen, Radevormwald, Halver, Kierspe and Marienheide.

Districts

The town Wipperfürth is made up of 8 districts:
 Wipperfürth
 Egen
 Kreuzberg (Wipperfürth)
 Ohl
 Agathaberg
 Thier
 Wipperfeld
 Hämmern

Localities

The coat of arms of Wipperfürth
The arms were granted on 9 December 1975 but were in use a long time before.
Wipperfürth received city rights between 1217 and 1222. The oldest seal dates from around 1250 and already shows a city wall, church and a small shield with the arms of the Counts of Berg, who ruled over the city. In the 14th century the small shield was removed. The present arms are based and nearly identical to the composition of the first seal. The city wall denotes the civic character of Wippenfürth, the church is the local St. Nicholas church.

Politics

Culture and places of interest

Dams

 Kierspe dam
 Neye dam
 Schevelinger dam
 Bever dam

Buildings

 Altes Seminar ("Old seminar") in the Lüdenscheider Straße.
 the former Franziskanerkloster (a cloister)

Churches

By far the oldest church in Wipperfürth is the Catholic parish church St.-Nikolaus placed in the downtown of Wipperfürth. Not far away, the Protestant church was built next to the marked-place in 1875. The so-called Antoniuskirche ("Antonius-church", a minister) was built on the Klosterberg ("cloister hill").

Spare time and sport
The town disposes of various sports field, stadium with field, indoor swimming pool with 25 meters of roads incl. sauna and sunbathing area, airfield, tennis courts, squash, riding spaces and play bowls.

Sport clubs
 Airfield – Wipperfürth-Neye EDKN
 DLRG Wipperfürth
 1.Wipperfürther Rock´n Roll Club
 BKV Oberberg
 Boxing club Wipperfürth
 BSG Wipperfürth
 Canoe friends Wipperfürth e. V.
 Aerial sport association Wipperfürth
 Motor sport club Wipperfürth in AAA road service e. V.
 Cycling club Wipperfürth
 Riding association Wipperfürth
 Chess club Wipperfürth
 Sports fisherman association Wipperfürth
 Sports club Wipperfürth
 Stadtsportverband Wipperfürth
 Dance corps
 Dance school Böhlefeld
 Diving sport community Wipperfürth
 TC Silber-Blau Wipperfürth
 TV Wipperfürth
 VfR Wipperfürth
 VSG Wipperfürth e. V.
 WTC Wipperfürth

Economy
During the industrial revolution several companies originated in the area of the textile industry. The most important industry company is the electric light bulb factory founded in 1904 Radium.

Radium also is even today together with the armature factory VOSS the biggest employer in Wipperfürth. Here particularly the electric-working industry, plastic-working industry, metal working industry and paper-working industry is resident.

Transport

Federal highways
Wipperfürth lies in the intersection of the federal highways B 237 (Remscheid- Meinerzhagen) and B 506 (Cologne – Wipperfürth). The B 256 unidirectional Gummersbach in the place Ohl for the B 237.

Bus routes
(VRS: Verkehrsverbund Rhein-Sieg, VRL: Verkehrsgemeinschaft Ruhr-Lippe), OVAG: Oberbergische Verkehrsgesellschaft AG, MVG: Märkische Verkehrsgesellschaft GmbH, KWS: Kraftverkehr Wupper-Sieg AG)
 VRS (KWS) Linie 426 to  Bergisch Gladbach (S) via Kürten
 VRS (KWS) Linie 427 to Bergisch Gladbach (S) via Kürten-Weiden
 VRS (KWS) Linie 429 to Bergisch Gladbach (S) via Kürten-Olpe
 VRS (OVAG) Linie 332 to Engelskirchen Bf. via Lindlar
 VRS (OVAG) Linie 333 to Engelskirchen Bf. via Lindlar-Frielingsdorf
 VRS (OVAG) Linie 336 to Marienheide via Gummersbach or ro Hückeswagen and Remscheid-Lennep
 VRS (OVAG) Linie 337 to Egen via Neye
 VRS (OVAG) Linie 338 to Kreuzberg
 VRL (MVG) Linie 55 to Lüdenscheid via Haken-Kreuzberg und Halver

Public facilities
 Employment centre
 District court
 Tax office
 Youth welfare office
 forestry office
 Test place of the safety standards authority
 Branch of the circle health office

Health
Hospitals: St. Josef hospital Wipperfürth (258 beds)

Education
The municipality has two high schools, Engelbert von Berg – Gymnasium (high school), and Archbishop of St. Angela Gymnasium (high school), a secondary modern school, a Konrad Adenauer – secondary school, a work pedagogic school (occupational lecture), eight elementary schools and two special schools.

Notable people
 Nicolas Abdat (* 1996), football player
 Johann Christian Josef Abs (1781–1823), teacher
 Johann Joseph Bauerband (1800–1878), lawyer, university professor, politician
 Franz Rudolf Bornewasser (1866–1951), bishop from Trier since 1922
 Franz Crass (1928–2012) Operatic bass singer
 Manuela Goller (born 1971), Football goalkeeper
 Thorsten Hens, professor, Department of Banking and Finance, University of Zurich
 Hans Leo Kausemann, former mayor and former District Administrator and honorary citizen
 Barbara Kisseler, civilized nation secretary in Berlin
 Mark Lamsfuß (* 1994), badminton player
 Udo Lattek (1935–2015), Retired football coach
 Stephan Ley (1867–1964), Beethoven scholar
 Ernst Lotz (1887–1948), the first minister of education and culture from Rhineland-Palatinate
 Konrad Martin (1812–1879), bishop of Paderborn
 Joseph Mausbach (1861–1931), Morality theologian, Sozialethiker, parliamentarian
 Frank Mock, Retired Football Coach
 Alois Pollender (1800–1879), discoverer anthrax bazillus (1855)
 Fritz Vollbach, composer and musician
 Hermann Voss, Former mayor and honorary citizen
 Sebastian Wurth (born 1994), Deutschland sucht den Superstar season 8 participant

Twin town
 Surgères, Charente-Maritime in France

Further sources of information

Literature (German)
Joseph John, Geschichte der Stadt Wipperfürth, Gummersbach 1842;
Conrad Schmitz, Geschichte der Stadt Wipperfürth, Wipperfürth 1910;
Paul Engel, Wipperfürth im Wandel der Zeiten, Wipperfürth 1949;
Peter Opladen, Das Dekanat Wipperfürth, Siegburg 1955;
Anneliese Triller/Jörg Füchtner, Das Abschriftenbuch der Stadt Wipperfürth, Essen 1969;
Frank Berger/Fred Antweiler, Wipperfürth gestern und heute, Remscheid 1984
Fred Antweiler/Frank Berger, Wipperfürth und seine Kirchdörfer, Bergisch Gladbach 1986.

References

External links
  

Towns in North Rhine-Westphalia
Members of the Hanseatic League
Districts of the Rhine Province
Oberbergischer Kreis